State Route 774 (SR 774) is an east–west state highway in the southwestern part of the U.S. state of Ohio.

Route description

Along its way, SR 774 traverses portions of eastern Clermont County and western Brown County.  No portion of this highway is included within the National Highway System, a network of routes considered to be most important for the country's economy, mobility and defense.

History
SR 774 was designated in 1938.  Originally, the highway ran from its present western terminus at State Route 133 north of Felicity to its junction with SR 125 in Hamersville.  One year later, the highway was extended northeasterly to its present eastern terminus at US 68 south of Mount Orab.

Major intersections

References

774
Transportation in Clermont County, Ohio
Transportation in Brown County, Ohio